Ferriola is a surname. Notable people with the surname include:

John J. Ferriola (born 1952/53), American businessman
Joseph Ferriola (1927–1989), American mobster

See also
Ferriols